Te Rerenga is a locality on the Whangapoua Harbour, Coromandel Peninsula, New Zealand. State Highway 25 runs through it. Coromandel is 12 km to the west. Whitianga lies to the south east. The Waitekuri and Opitonui Rivers flow from the Coromandel Range in the west and south through the area to drain in the Whangapoua Harbour.

Demographics
Mercury Bay North statistical area covers the northeastern Coromandel from just north of Coroglen to New Chums Beach, but excludes Whitianga.

Mercury Bay North had a population of 1,611 at the 2018 New Zealand census, an increase of 294 people (22.3%) since the 2013 census, and an increase of 351 people (27.9%) since the 2006 census. There were 651 households, comprising 804 males and 804 females, giving a sex ratio of 1.0 males per female. The median age was 53.2 years (compared with 37.4 years nationally), with 231 people (14.3%) aged under 15 years, 180 (11.2%) aged 15 to 29, 750 (46.6%) aged 30 to 64, and 447 (27.7%) aged 65 or older.

Ethnicities were 93.5% European/Pākehā, 11.5% Māori, 0.9% Pacific peoples, 1.3% Asian, and 2.2% other ethnicities. People may identify with more than one ethnicity.

The percentage of people born overseas was 16.8, compared with 27.1% nationally.

Although some people chose not to answer the census's question about religious affiliation, 60.3% had no religion, 27.4% were Christian, 0.2% had Māori religious beliefs, 0.2% were Hindu, 0.2% were Muslim, 0.6% were Buddhist and 2.4% had other religions.

Of those at least 15 years old, 240 (17.4%) people had a bachelor's or higher degree, and 240 (17.4%) people had no formal qualifications. The median income was $24,800, compared with $31,800 nationally. 156 people (11.3%) earned over $70,000 compared to 17.2% nationally. The employment status of those at least 15 was that 522 (37.8%) people were employed full-time, 294 (21.3%) were part-time, and 30 (2.2%) were unemployed.

Education
Te Rerenga School is a coeducational full primary (years 1–8) school with a roll of  students as of  The school celebrated its centennial in 2008.

References

Thames-Coromandel District
Populated places in Waikato